William "Junie" Sanders (born May 12, 1972) is an American basketball player. He played high school ball at John Jay High School before he moved on to Independence Community College.  He later played in the United States Basketball League and several foreign nations, including Argentina, Luxembourg, Germany, Israel, Poland, Portugal, and Puerto Rico. He played in the NBA D-League with Fayetteville Patriots for 2 years, where in his second year he averaged 16.9 points per game. As a streetball player, Junie has won in the range of $10,000 on a single game.  In streetball he scored 39 points on NBA All Star Jerry Stackhouse.  In streetball, he was nicknamed "General Electric".

References

1972 births
Living people
American men's basketball players
Fayetteville Patriots players